Floridatragulus is an extinct genus of camelids.

References

Prehistoric camelids
Miocene mammals of North America
Prehistoric even-toed ungulate genera
Miocene even-toed ungulates
Fossil taxa described in 1969